Christopher David Manning (born September 18, 1965) is an Australian computer scientist, best known for his books Complex Predicates and Information Spreading in LFG (1999), and Introduction to Information Retrieval (2008). He is the Thomas M. Siebel Professor in Machine Learning and a professor of Computer Science and Linguistics at Stanford University. He is the namesake of Manning's Law. He developed the CoreNLP software. He was previously President of the Association for Computational Linguistics (2015).

Manning received BA degrees in mathematics, computer science, and linguistics from the Australian National University (1989) and a PhD in Linguistics from Stanford (1994), under the guidance of Joan Bresnan. He was an assistant professor at Carnegie Mellon University (1994-96) and a lecturer at the University of Sydney (1996-99) before returning to Stanford as an assistant professor. Back at Stanford, he was promoted to associate professor in 2006 and to full professor in 2012.

Manning's PhD students include Dan Klein, Richard Socher, and Sepandar Kamvar. In 2021, he joined AIX Ventures as an Investment Partner. AIX Ventures is a venture capital fund that invests in artificial intelligence startups.

Bibliography

References 

1965 births
Living people
Australian computer scientists